Dwaine Kavanagh (born 1989 in Myshall, County Carlow, Ireland) is an Irish sportsperson.  He plays hurling with his local club Naomh Eoin and has been a member of the Carlow senior inter-county team since 2011.

References

1989 births
Living people
Naomh Eoin hurlers
Carlow inter-county hurlers